The Pagan Winter is the first studio recording by Hungarian symphonic black metal band Sear Bliss. In that time founder/bass guitarist András Nagy was only 17 years old. Thanks to this demo Mascot Records from the Netherlands offered a three-album contract and signed the band.

Mascot Records re-released The Pagan Winter on CD in 1997 following the success of Sear Bliss's debut album Phantoms.

Track listing 
 "Ancient" – 4:54
 "The Pagan Winter" – 4:24
 "…Where the Darkness Always Reigned" – 7:20
 "Twilight" – 4:33
 "In the Shadow of Another World" (re-issue bonus track) – 12:02

Credits 
Zoltán Csejtei – vocals 
Csaba Csejtei – guitar 
János Barbarics – guitar 
Winter – synthesizer, lyrics 
András Nagy – bass guitar 
Gergely Szűcs – trumpet 
Balázs Bertalan – drums (session fill-in)
Zoltán Máté – guest vocals on "Twilight"

Re-release 
The original track list was extended by a 12-minute song called "In the Shadow of Another World" recorded between November 7–11, 1996 in Nautilus Studio, Sopron, Hungary. Kris Verwimp created new artwork for the re-release.

Sear Bliss line-up at "In the Shadow of Another World" recording:
András Nagy – bass guitar, vocals
János Barbarics – guitar 
Csaba Csejtei – guitar 
Zoltán Csejtei – drums
Winter – synthesizer
Gergely Szűcs – trumpet

External links 
Sear Bliss Official Site
Encyclopaedia Metallum

Sear Bliss albums
1995 debut albums
Mascot Records albums